Johann Friedrich Karl Asperger (18 February 1906 – 21 October 1980 was an Austrian psychiatrist. He is remembered for his pioneering studies of autism, specifically in children. His name was given to Asperger syndrome, a form of autism defined in 1981 by Lorna Wing, which is now referred to as Autism spectrum disorder - level 1 as per the DSM-5. He wrote more than 300 publications on psychological disorders that posthumously acquired international renown in the 1980s. He had previously termed the diagnosis, "autistic psychopathy", which garnered controversy. Further controversy arose during the late 2010s over allegations that Asperger referred children to a Nazi German clinic responsible for murdering disabled patients, although his knowledge and involvement remain unknown.

His role in Austria annexed by the Nazis remained unknown for a long time, until the study of archival documents. These show that Hans Asperger, who worked under the direction of his friend Franz Hamburger, collaborated with the Government of Nazi Germany, benefited from career advancement due to the flight of Jewish doctors, and participated in the selection of children sent to Am Spiegelgrund clinic, where some of them were murdered. The question of his personal adherence to Nazi ideology remains controversial, particularly because of his Catholic religious convictions.

Biography
Hans Asperger was born in Hausbrunn, Austria, on February 18,1906, and was raised on a farm not far from the city. The eldest of three sons, his younger brother died shortly after birth. As a youth, he joined the Wandering Scholars of the Bund Neuland(in the group of Fahrende Scholaren, which organized outdoor activities such as hiking and mountaineering). "Founded in 1921, the Austria-based Bund was a split-off from the Christian-German Student Union (CDSB) but stressed its affinities with the German Youth Movement (...) which Asperger cited in 1974 as a guiding principle in his life".  He later stated that "[he] was moulded by the spirit of the German youth movement, which was one of the noblest blossoms of the German spirit". This movement maintained close links with the Hitler Youth from the 1930s onwards.

Hans Asperger was described as "cold and distant ". He collected over 10,000 books in his personal library during his lifetime. He attributed his "progressive spiritual maturity" to his reading. His former colleagues at the pediatric clinic in Vienna testified that he often quoted classical authors, poets or the Bible.

According to his daughter Maria Asperger-Felder, the two events that most affected Hans Asperger between 1931 and 1945 were, on the one hand, the development of curative education (Heilpadagogik), and on the other hand, the confrontation with the ideology of National Socialism.

Family 
Hans Asperger married Hanna Kalmon in 1935, whom he met during a mountain hike, and with whom he had five children; four daughters and a son: Gertrud (born 1936), Hans (born 1938), Hedwig (born 1940), Maria (born 1946) and Brigitte (born 1948). In 1961, Gertrud Asperger completed her doctorate at Innsbruck. Another daughter, Maria Asperger Felder, became a renowned child psychiatrist. Hans Asperger and his daughter were also "socially well-connected".

Religion 
Hans Asperger was a devout Christian, a practicing Catholic , but without the political tendencies generally associated with Catholicism at the time. His faith was initially considered a disadvantage in his evaluation after the Anschluss. He was a member of the Sankt-Lukas Guild, which, according to Sheffer and Czech, "advocated for Catholic eugenics,"  including support for positive eugenics (the multiplication of individuals considered desirable) rather than negative eugenics.

Education
Hans Asperger claimed to have discovered his future vocation as a doctor by dissecting the liver of a mouse during his final year of high school. He passed his secondary school final examination on May 20, 1925, with distinction and the grade of "very good" in all subjects.

According to his daughter, from 1916 to 1928, he followed an education oriented towards humanism, learning western philosophy, Latin and ancient Greek. Asperger studied medicine at the University of Vienna under Franz Hamburger and practiced at the University Children's Hospital in Vienna. Asperger earned his medical degree in 1931 and became director of the special education section at the university's children's clinic in Vienna in 1932. He joined the Austrofascist Fatherland Front on 10 May 1934, nine days after Chancellor Engelbert Dollfuss passed a new constitution making himself dictator.

Career

Early career (1930-1938) 
According to Czech, "with the appointment of Hamburger as president in 1930, the Vienna pediatric clinic became a beacon of anti-Jewish policy, long before the Nazi takeover"

After the death of Clemens von Pirquet in 1929, Franz Hamburger expelled the Jewish doctors from the clinic, and also tried to remove the women. Hans Asperger thus obtained his first post in May 1931, thanks to the "purge" of Jewish doctors, as Hamburger's assistant at the University Paediatric Clinic in Vienna. He then worked for different departments. Czech points out the changes in leadership: "The political orientation of Hamburger's assistants is illustrated by the fact that among those who obtained the highest academic qualification (habilitation), all, with the exception of Hans Asperger, were rejected in 1945 as Nazis". Under the influence of Franz Chvostek junior, the Vienna clinic became a "hotbed of pan-Germanist and Nazi agitation".

When Erwin Lazar, the head of the curative pedagogy department died in 1932, Hans Asperger took over in May 1934 or 1935, as head of the department of Heilpadagogik (or: Heilpadagogische curative pedagogy) at the pediatric clinic in Vienna. He joined an experienced team, consisting of psychiatrist George Frankl (who was Jewish), psychologist Josef Feldner and a nun, Sister Viktorine Zak.
 Asperger's very rapid rise to head of the pediatric ward, despite his few publications and the existence of more qualified candidates, was facilitated by the anti-Jewish policy. The team also included, from August 1933 to February 1936, a young doctor specializing in gastrointestinal disorders, Erwin Jekelius, who later became a major architect of the Nazi extermination. The pedagogy employed in Heilpadagogik was inspired by Erwin Lazar, the founder of the clinic; Asperger continued and developed this approach. He was influenced by two pedagogues, Jan-Daniel Georgens and Johann Heinrich Deinhardt, who founded a specialized institute in 1856. He is particularly interested in the "psychically abnormal child".

In addition to Hamburger and Jekelius, Asperger frequented other Nazi ideologues, including Erwin Risak, who studied with him in 1931 and with whom he co-authored an article the following year. There is, however, no documented evidence that Asperger joined groups of Nazi sympathizers before 1938.

His career was spent entirely in Vienna, with two brief exceptions. In 1934 he was invited to work for some time at the psychiatric clinic in Leipzig, with Paul Schröder.  He was also invited for three months, during the summer of 1934, to the psychiatric hospital in Vienna, directed by Otto Pötzl (whom he would later describe as a "terrifying exterminator"). He joined the nationalist and anti-Semitic German Medical Association in Austria the same year.

World War II (1939-1945) 

During World War II, Asperger was a medical officer, serving in the Axis occupation of Yugoslavia; his younger brother died at Stalingrad. Near the end of the war, Asperger opened a school for children with Sister Viktorine Zak. The school was bombed and destroyed, Viktorine was killed, and much of Asperger's early work was lost.

Asperger published a definition of autistic psychopathy in 1944 that resembled the definition published earlier by a Russian neurologist named Grunya Sukhareva in 1926. Asperger identified in four boys a pattern of behavior and abilities that included “a lack of empathy, little ability to form friendships, one-sided conversations, intense absorption in a special interest, and clumsy movements”.  Asperger noticed that some of the children he identified as being autistic used their special talents in adulthood and had successful careers. One of them became a professor of astronomy and solved an error in Newton's work that he had originally noticed as a student.
 Another one of Asperger's patients was the Austrian writer and Nobel Prize in Literature laureate, Elfriede Jelinek.

Under the Third Reich, with his position as a doctor in Vienna, Hans Asperger was a decision-maker in the context of examinations of minors: he could defend them if he thought they would integrate into Volk (the national community of Nazi Germany), or the contrary, sending to Spiegelgrund the minors he thought were too deficit, and therefore unfit for integration. Am Spiegelgrund clinic, created in July 1940 on the premises of the Steinhof psychiatric hospital in Vienna, was directed by Erwin Jekelius, a former colleague of Asperger's at the university clinic who became a major architect of the extermination policy, from June 1940 until the end of 1941.

During the last two years of the Second World War, from April 1943, Asperger was a doctor for the Wehrmacht. He underwent nine months of training in Vienna and Brünn, then was sent with the 392nd Infantry Division to Croatia in December 1943 as part of a "mission of protection" of the occupied territories in Yugoslavia and the struggle against the "partisans". The Heilpadagogik, in which Asperger worked before his military service, was destroyed in 1944 by a bombing, in which sister Viktorine Zak was killed.

In 1944, after the publication of his landmark paper describing autistic symptoms, Asperger found a permanent tenured post at the University of Vienna. Shortly after the war ended, he became director of a children's clinic in the city. There, he was appointed chair of pediatrics at the University of Vienna, a post he held for twenty years. He later held a post at Innsbruck.

Post-World War II (1945 - to death) 
Hans Asperger resumed his academic career after the war, in 1945, returning to the department he was directing, which had been destroyed by a bombardment. His authorization to teach was confirmed on February 9, 1946, because he was not a member of the NSDAP.

Between 1946 and 1949, he was deputy director of the pediatric clinic in Vienna. In 1948, he co-founded the pediatric clinic, Osterreichischen Arbeitsgemeinschaft fur Heilpadagogik (now the Heilpadagogische Gesellschaft Osterreichs) in Innsbruck, Austria, for 5 years, succeeding Richard Priesel, who died suddenly on November 18, 1955. Documentation of this part of his life is scarce. Hans Asperger's name is the last one mentioned on the list of recommendations, after those of three other doctors. Asperger took up his new position on March 31, 1957, with an inaugural lecture devoted to problems in modern pediatrics. According to the Innsbruck historian Franz Huter (1899-1997), Hans Asperger "quickly created a circle of friends and colleagues". His wife Hanna preferred to stay in Vienna. He was generally appreciated there for his pedagogy.

Asperger was then appointed to the chair of pediatrics at the Vienna hospital on June 26, 1962, and was its director until his official retirement in 1977. In 1964 he was in charge of SOS-Kinderdorf in Hinterbrüh. In the same year he was appointed president of the Internationalen Gesellschaft fur Heilpadagogik.

On May 8, 1971, he was appointed vice-president of the newly founded Austrian Society for Allergy and Immunology (Osterreichischen Gesellschaft fur Allergologie und Immunologie).

He became professor emeritus in 1977, and died three years later on October 20, 1980, after a short illness.

Allegations of persecution by the Gestapo 

According to his statement in 1962, the Gestapo attempted to arrest Hans Asperger because of his remarks during his 1938 lecture. However, the only known source for this claim is Hans Asperger, who mentions this incident during the inauguration of his chair of pediatrics, and then claims to have been "saved from the Gestapo" by his mentor Franz Hamburger, during an interview in 1974,. During the same interview, he claimed to have "volunteered for the army to escape Gestapo reprisals because he had refused to cooperate with Nazi racial hygiene policies" . There is no evidence in the archives of any attempted arrest by the Gestapo ."Other facts speak against Asperger's self-portrayal as a man persecuted by the Gestapo for his resistance to Nazi racial hygiene, who had to flee into military service to avoid further problems. On several occasions, he published approving comments on racial hygiene measures such as forced sterilizations."

- Herwig Czech, Hans Asperger, National Socialism, and "race hygiene" in Nazi-era ViennaThere is no archival evidence that Asperger's publications were perceived to be opposed to the new regime. In November 1940, the Vienna Gestapo responded that it had "nothing on him" to a request for a political evaluation of Asperger: this is the only documented interaction between Asperger and the Gestapo,. Czech believes that this Gestapo investigation is the source of Asperger's subsequent claim that he was being persecuted, and that his Nazi party (NSDAP) mentor, Franz Hamburger, most likely vouched for his assistant while asking him to cooperate with the ruling regime, which would explain Asperger's statement during his 1974 interview.

Nazi involvement 

Edith Sheffer, a modern European history scholar, wrote in 2018 that Asperger cooperated with the Nazi regime, including sending children to the Am Spiegelgrund clinic which participated in the euthanasia program.

Herwig Czech, another scholar and historian from the Medical University of Vienna, concluded in a 2017 article in the journal Molecular Autism, which was published in April 2018:

Asperger managed to accommodate himself to the Nazi regime and was rewarded for his affirmations of loyalty with career opportunities. He joined several organizations affiliated with the NSDAP (although not the Nazi party itself), publicly legitimized 'race hygiene' policies including forced sterilizations and, on several occasions, actively cooperated with the child 'euthanasia' program. 

However, he worked under the direction of Franz Hamburger, a prominent long-time member of the NSDAP for whom he expressed the greatest admiration signed his letters with the formula "Heil Hitler", and joined organizations affiliated with the Nazi Party after 1938. (Deutsche Arbeitsfront, Nationalsozialistische Volkswohlfahrt, Nationalsozialistischer Deutscher Arztebund). For Czech, "by renouncing membership in the NSDAP, he chose a middle path between staying away from the new regime and aligning himself with it.".

Dean Falk, an American anthropologist from Florida State University, questioned Czech and Sheffer's allegations against Hans Asperger in a paper in Journal of Autism and Developmental Disorders. Czech's reply was published in the same journal.
 Falk defended her paper against Czech's reply in a second paper.

Norwegian doctor and historical scholar Ketil Slagstad added his interpretation of both Sheffer's and Czech's work in his 2019 article "Asperger, the Nazis and the children - the history of the birth of a diagnosis", in which he describes the nuances of the situation. He offers an alternative explanation of Asperger's involvement: citing the challenges of war, a desire to protect his career, and the protection of the children he cared for. 

Slagstad concluded:

The story of Hans Asperger, Nazism, murdered children, post-war oblivion, the birth of the diagnosis in the 1980s, the gradual expansion of the diagnostic criteria and the huge recent interest in autism spectrum disorders exemplify the historical and volatile nature of diagnoses: they are historic constructs that reflect the times and societies where they exert their effect.

Slagstad also wrote, "Historical research has now shown that [Asperger] was...a well-adapted cog in the machine of a deadly regime. He deliberately referred disabled children to the clinic Am Spiegelgrund, where he knew that they were at risk of being killed. The eponym Asperger’s syndrome ought to be used with an awareness of its historical origin".

After the Anschluss, Asperger, like all medical personnel, was investigated in the application of the "decree on the reorganization of the Austrian professional civil service" dated May 31, 1938, and then received confidential evaluations from NSDAP officials, who expressed an increasingly positive opinion of him. His first evaluation, dated June 1939, judged him "politically acceptable from the National Socialist point of view", "unassailable as far as his character and politics are concerned", and concluded with the statement that Asperger was "in conformity with the racial and sterilization laws of National Socialism", despite his Catholic orientation. In October 1940, he wrote that he had "committed himself to work for the Hitler Youth. Czech analyzed this as a desire to adapt to the new regime and to protect his career. Hans Asperger was never considered an opponent of the regime.According to Czech, "Asperger’s political socialization in Neuland likely blinded him to National Socialism’s destructive character due to an affinity with core ideological elements". Czech asserts that Asperger "publicly protected his patients from forced sterilization", supporting his claim with Asperger's description of his patients "whose abnormity is not of a type that would call for sterilization, who would socially fail without our understanding and guiding assistance, but who with this help are able to occupy their place in the large organism of our people".

In 1939, he published an article with his colleague Heribert Goll, in which he "demonstrated" that innate or hereditary characteristics determine later personality traits. This article was published in the journal, edited by Otmar von Verschuer, a prominent propagator of Racial hygiene theories. According to Czech's analysis, "Asperger went so far in these attempts [to prove his loyalty to the NSDAP] that his collaborator Josef Feldner had to restrain him, lest he risks his credibility"

Asperger obtained his accreditation in 1943, passing the political control of the (National Socialist League of German Lecturers).

The British psychiatrist Lorna Wing and the anthropologist Dean Falk consider that Hans Asperger's Catholic convictions are incompatible with the voluntary sending of children to extermination programs. For Falk, it is not certain that Asperger was aware of the fate awaiting the children he had transferred to: knowing his religion, his colleagues could have hidden this information from him. Czech concludes that "The assumption that Asperger was unaware of the risks to the children is unfounded".

The curative pedagogy promoted by Hans Asperger was never considered to be contrary to the objectives of the Third Reich, which was marked by a shortage of manpower. Moreover, this approach was approved by euthanasia policy makers such as Erwin Jekelius. Only children considered to be educable benefit from it. Hans Asperger's text, which is most often interpreted as a defense of his autistic patients against the "euthanasia" program, can also be read in a utilitarian way. For Scheffer, "the examination of the archives reveals the dual nature of his action "  :He distinguished between young people whom he considered amendable, endowed with a potential for "social integration", and those judged irrecoverable. At the same time as he offered intensive and individualized care to promising children, he ordered the placement in an institution or even the transfer to the home of severely handicapped children.

- Edith Sheffer, Children of Asperger's Czech believes that the argument that Asperger placed a positive emphasis on a small number of autistic individuals in order to protect all autistic children does not hold water. For Sheffer, Asperger is a "self-proclaimed eugenicist "  and "this duality of Asperger's mirrors that of Nazism as a whole".

Children sent to Spiegelgrund 

In 1940, Asperger obtained a position as a medical expert in Vienna, for which he was responsible for diagnosing "hereditary diseases" and proposing forced sterilization in the interest of the Nazi eugenics program. Even at that time, the excess mortality in Vienna's psychiatric hospitals was well known to the population, which protested against this situation, especially in September and November 1940. According to Czech's analysis of Hans Asperger's written diagnoses, he was not "more benevolent towards his patients than his peers in labelling children with diagnoses that could have an enormous impact on their future - quite the contrary "; in the majority of cases, Asperger made a harsher judgment than other doctors towards the children and adolescents he examined.

He described one of the children he recommended for Am Spiegelgrund on June 27, 1941, Herta Schreiber, as follows:"Severe personality disorder (post-encephalic?): very severe motor retardation; erethic idiocy; epileptic seizures. The child is an unbearable burden at home for her mother, who has five healthy children to care for. A permanent placement in seems absolutely necessary"

- Dr. Asperger, WStLA file, 1.3.2.209.10, Herta Schreiber, Heilpädagogische Abteilung der Universitäts-Kinderklinik Vienna, 27 June 1941Sent to the hospital on July 1 as Asperger had requested, Herta Schreiber died there two months later, on September 2, officially of "pneumonia".

In 1942, following a request addressed to his superior Franz Hamburger, Asperger took part in a selection of patients aimed at separating the "uneducable" from those who could become German citizens. Although he was not directly responsible for their death, he chose 35 children whom he considered to be "uneducable ".

While he did not cooperate with the forced sterilization programs according to the records, he also did not oppose them. According to Czech, "what emerges from the available sources is that Asperger's approach to the forced sterilization program was ambivalent ". He quotes passages written by Hans Asperger demonstrating his support for this aspect of racial hygiene policy:"In the new Germany, we took on new responsibilities in addition to our old ones. To the task of helping the individual patient is added the great obligation to promote the health of the people [], which is more than the well-being of the individual. I need not add to the enormous amount of dedicated work done in terms of affirmative action and support. But we all know that we must also take restrictive measures.

- Hans Asperger, Pädagogische Therapie bei abnormen KindernThere is a possible protective case of a patient, Aurel I., whom Hans Asperger examined in the fall of 1939 and exempted from group education. His family sent him to the countryside, where he survived the war under his parents' care. In 1962, a member of Asperger's family believed that he had saved Aurel from "castration" and possibly worse. The Austrian psychiatrist wrote his report a few days before the introduction of the sterilization law in Austria.

Hansi Busztin 
The Heilpadagogik Vienna department, where Asperger worked, is known to have taken in Hansi Busztin from September 1942, a Jewish patient in hiding until the end of the war, who states that about a hundred people knew of his existence, and that this department housed "a group of opponents of National Socialism". However, Busztin does not mention Hans Asperger's name, and the Austrian psychiatrist makes no reference to this episode even after the war, even though it could have helped him establish anti-Nazi credentials. According to Czech, Asperger may have been aware of this Jewish patient, but he did not take an active role in protecting him, and more importantly, joined the Wehrmacht only six months after Busztin's admission. Czech considers it likely that Asperger joined the Wehrmacht to protect himself in case Busztin's presence in his ward was discovered, rather than because of "persecution by the Gestapo," which is not proven. However, he also did not denounce the presence of this Jewish child.

Works and publications 
Hans Asperger published a total of 359 texts, most of them devoted to "autistic psychopathy" and the notion of death. All of his publications are written in German. According to Edith Sheffer, the context in which Asperger evolved facilitated the development of his most famous publication, insofar as he and his colleagues frequently used the notion of "Gemut", which had been misused in Nazi psychiatry to refer to "the metaphysical capacity of humans to form social bonds ". This caused Nazi doctors and psychiatrists to pay attention to children they considered to have a weak Gemut. The first description of autism was thus based on an observation of this population of children. Czech, on the other hand, believes that Sheffer places too much emphasis on the concept of Gemut and that "psychiatry under National Socialism is much better characterized by the concept of a life unworthy of being lived".

Die "Autistischen Psychopathen" im Kindersalter 
Hans Asperger established in 1943 the description of an "autistic psychopathy of childhood ". He identified in over 200 children (including 4 cases of young boys described in detail ) a pattern of behavior and skills including "lack of empathy, poor ability to make friends, unidirectional conversation, strong preoccupation with special interests, and awkward movements. " Asperger calls these four boys his "little teachers" because of their ability to talk about their favourite subject in great detail. His article was not published until 1944 in the journal:

(de) "Die 'Autistischen Psychopathen' im Kindesalter", Archiv fur Psychiatrie und Nervenkrankheiten, no 117, 1944, p.76-136 — the article appeared in 1938 in Wiener Klinischen Wochenschrift.

Other publications 
 
 
 
 

 

 
 
 
 
 
 
 
 
 
 
 
 
 
 
 
 
 
 ;
 Chapters:
 "Schwierigkeiten Hochbegabter ".

Posthumous adoption of Asperger syndrome diagnosis 

Due to his major role in defining the notion of the "autism spectrum", Hans Asperger has been "often touted as a champion of neurodiversity,"  particularly by Adam Feinstein and Steve Silberman. Although he died before his identification of behavioural patterns in autistic people became widely recognized, this was in part due to his work being exclusively in German and as such it was little translated.

After the Second World War and before access to the archives concerning him, Hans Asperger had a reputation as a protector of sick and handicapped children, notably under the influence of Uta Frith's book published in 1991. His earliest detractor, Eric Schopler, portrayed him instead as participating in racial hygiene programs, but without being able to provide evidence of this.

He has been portrayed as progressive and opposed to eugenics under the Nazi regime, including by Lorna Wing  and Steve Silberman (in his book, NeuroTribes, published in 2015 ). The educator Brita Schirmer, who first published about Hans Asperger's relationship with Nazism in 2002, gives her article an explicit title: "Hans Aspergers Verteidigung der 'autistischen Psychopathen' gegen die NSEgenik'", i.e. "Hans Asperger's defense of autistic psychopaths against Nazi eugenics " . Helmut Gröger, on the basis of Asperger's scientific publications, concludes that he generally avoided addressing themes related to Nazi ideology, such as race .

His description of the technical contributions of the four children described in his 1944 article is initially interpreted in terms of a desire to protect them. Adam Feinstein's (2010) book argues that Asperger deliberately disseminated Nazi-friendly references in his writing in order to hide his true intent. This perception was facilitated by his self-portrait as a protector of children and a resister. In his 1974 interview, Asperger stated that when "the time for National Socialism came, it was clear from my previous life that one could well accept many 'national' things, but not inhumanity (Unmenschlichkeiten)". John Donvan and Caren Zucker's book, In A Different Key, is according to Czech, who shared some of her sources with the authors, "the first publication in the English language to break with the narrative of Asperger as an active opponent of Nazi racial hygiene and to introduce hitherto unknown critical elements into the debate".

The Translation of Asperger's Work in the Late 20th Century
English researcher Lorna Wing proposed the condition Asperger's syndrome in a 1981 paper, Asperger's syndrome: a clinical account, that challenged the previously accepted model of autism presented by Leo Kanner in 1943. It was not until 1991 that an authoritative translation of Asperger's work was made by Uta Frith; before this, Asperger's syndrome had still been "virtually unknown". 
Frith says that fundamental questions regarding the diagnosis had not been answered, and the necessary scientific data to address this did not exist.In the early 1990s, Asperger's work gained some notice due to Wing's research on the subject and Frith's recent translation, leading to the inclusion of the eponymous condition in the International Statistical Classification of Diseases and Related Health Problems 10th revision (ICD-10) in 1993, and the American Psychiatric Association's Diagnostic and Statistical Manual of Mental Disorders 4th revision (DSM-IV) in 1994, some half a century after Asperger's original research. 
In Asperger's 1944 paper, as Frith translated in 1991, he wrote: "We are convinced, then, that autistic people have their place in the organism of the social community. They fulfill their role well, perhaps better than anyone else could, and we are talking of people who as children had the greatest difficulties and caused untold worries to their caregivers." Based on Frith's translation, however, Asperger initially stated: "Unfortunately, in the majority of cases the positive aspects of autism do not outweigh the negative ones. Psychologist Eric Schopler wrote in 1998: "Asperger's publications did not inspire research, replication, or scientific interest before 1980. Instead, he laid the fertile groundwork for the diagnostic confusion that has grown since 1980."

Despite this brief resurgence of interest in his work in the 1990s, Asperger's syndrome remained a controversial and contentious diagnosis due to its unclear relationship to the autism spectrum.

Perceptions of Asperger's work in the 21st century
In 2010, there was a majority consensus to subsume Asperger's syndrome into the diagnosis "Autistic Spectrum Disorder" in the 2013 DSM-5 diagnostic manual. The World Health Organization's ICD-10 Version 2015 describes Asperger's syndrome as “a disorder of uncertain nosological validity”.

Czech was the first to study the issue of Hans Asperger's Jewish patientsS 28. While Asperger did not express overtly anti-Semitic ideas, his public statements and Asperger's treatment of his Jewish patients show an indifference to the persecution suffered by this population. He also seems to have internalized at least some of the anti-Jewish stereotypes of his time.

Czech and Sheffer believe that Hans Asperger's diagnoses are sexist, while Dean Falk refutes that Hans Asperger was sexist.

Sheffer devotes a chapter of his book to the differences between the diagnoses of boys and girls. According to Claude Grimal's review in the journal , it should not be considered surprising that Asperger's diagnoses contain "all the gender biases of the time ".

Czech notes that Hans Asperger's gender bias leads to "disadvantaging girls in terms of sexual abuse and precociousness", adding that he blames victims of sexual abuse. Czech cites, in particular, the example of the diagnosis of a 12-year-old Jewish girl, whom Asperger says "acted like a madwoman, talked about anti-Jewish persecution, was afraid," interpreting these signs of distress as symptoms of schizophrenia, and concluding his report, "for her age and race, sexual development is visibly retarded".

In Steve Silberman's first edition of his book, in 2015, before the publication of the archives studied by Czech, Silberman openly supports Asperger's work, postulating that, if Asperger's syndrome had been used as the basis for defining autism in the twentieth century, rather than Leo Kanner's infantile autism, individuals with autism and their families would have avoided a great deal of suffering, positive criteria would have been used for diagnosis rather than deficits, and financial resources would have been allocated more quickly to supporting individuals with autism themselves rather than to seeking therapies and cures.

According to Czech, it is from April 2018 onwards that Hans Asperger's legacy is seriously questioned, notably through an editorial and press release distributed by, widely reported in the media, and then by the publication of Edith Sheffer's book a few weeks later. This gave rise to some sensationalist media exaggerations concerning the true role of Asperger's. Silberman reconsidered his position, pointing out that people with autism who once saw Hans Asperger as an ally probably felt betrayed, and updated new editions of his book.

In Asperger's Children, historian Edith Scheffer argues for the abandonment of the notion of "Asperger's syndrome". After reading this book, Judy Sasha Rubinsztein says she is "convinced not to use the term 'Asperger's Syndrome' because it raises the spectre of that barbaric time when medical values were distorted to support Nazi ideology. Professor Simon Baron-Cohen states that, in light of Czech and Sheffer's findings, "we now need to revise our views, and probably our language as well", by no longer referring to "Asperger's syndrome" but only to "autism". In contrast, the American journalist Seth Mnookin does not agree with Sheffer's conclusion, which he analyzes as an attempt to deconstruct the notion of autism by falsely making it sound like a "Nazi invention".

The reactions of autistic people to the revelations about Hans Asperger's past are varied: some are attached to the terminology of "Asperger's syndrome", while others testify in favour of abandoning this name. This is notably the case of the doctor of philosophy Josef Schovanec, who states:

"Even more than his links with Nazism, it is what must have been Dr. Asperger's strong point that will seal his doom, namely his ability to sort out children among humans."

- Josef Schovanec

Did Hans Asperger have Asperger's syndrome?
In 2007, Viktoria Lyons and Michael Fitzgerald (a controversial expert in retrospective diagnosis) hypothesized that Hans Asperger was affected by autism, as they believed that he exhibited features of the very disorder that later received his name as a child. The article is based on a German newsletter  and on the book by Uta Frith, published in 1991.

This hypothesis was taken up by the investigative journalist Steve Silberman  and by Élisabeth Roudinesco, who asserted that Hans Asperger was affected during his childhood by the syndrome he later described. It is refuted by Sheffer, who believes that the diagnostic criteria for Asperger's syndrome are irrelevant (and even less so in retrospect), but also that Asperger's "severe criticism" of "autistic psychopaths" precludes the possibility that he would have considered applying a diagnosis that he judged so negatively to himself.

Czech points out that "the potential obstacles to his [Hans Asperger's] support for National Socialism were his religious convictions, his humanistic background, and his elitist and cultured habitus. He adds that "Asperger's political socialization at the time probably blinded him to the destructiveness of National Socialism because of an affinity with its ideological core elements."

References

Notes

Bibliography

Further reading

External links 
 

1906 births
1980 deaths
20th-century Austrian physicians
20th-century Austrian scientists
Austrian Nazis
Austrian pediatricians
Autism researchers
Combat medics
German Army officers of World War II
Nazi eugenics
University of Vienna alumni